Zalingei Airport  is an airport serving the city of Zalingei in Central Darfur, Sudan.

Accidents and incidents
 On 11 November 2010, an Antonov An-24 of Tarco Airlines on a flight from Khartoum crashed and caught fire on the runway on landing. Two of the 44 people on board were killed.

References

Airports in Sudan
Central Darfur